David Herbert Munro (born April 29, 1955 in Oakland, California) is a physicist at Lawrence Livermore National Laboratory (LLNL) who created the programming language Yorick as well as the scientific graphics library Gist.

Munro earned his BS at Caltech (1976) and PhD at the Massachusetts Institute of Technology (1980). He joined LLNL in 1980 and has primarily focused his research on laser fusion.

He received the Excellence in Plasma Physics award of the American Physical Society in 1995 and was elected a Fellow of the American Physical Society in 2001 "For his seminal contributions to the design of laser-driven Rayleigh-Taylor experiments, and to the analysis and design of shock-timing experiments for cryogenic inertial confinement fusion targets".

References

"David Herbert Munro." Marquis Who's Who TM. Marquis Who's Who, 2009.  Fee (via Fairfax County Public Library). Reproduced in Biography Resource Center. Farmington Hills, Michigan.: Gale, 2009.  http://galenet.galegroup.com/servlet/BioRC.  Accessed 2009-10-22.  Document Number: K2015715582.

External links
RPM shipped by David H. Munro -- yorick-1.4-15.i386 (downloadable free software for Linux, listing as of Wednesday, March 29, 2006 16:05:02)

21st-century American physicists
1955 births
Living people
People from Oakland, California
Massachusetts Institute of Technology alumni
California Institute of Technology alumni
Lawrence Livermore National Laboratory staff
Programming language designers
Fellows of the American Physical Society